Reema Sathe (born 5 September) is an Indian social activist and entrepreneur. She created a food company that shares its profits more fairly with small farmers. She was awarded the Nari Shakti Puraskar for her work in 2017. She has been Featured by the Forbes Magazine for her work in 2018 and by the World Bank Group and United Nations Development Program in 2019.

Life 
Sathe was trained as a chemical engineer.

She started her social enterprise, "Happy Roots" after working for seven years in the food and beverage industry. She left her steady job in 2014 to become self employed. Sathe was deeply moved by the challenges small and marginal farmers afec, especially women, while she was working for a new company named "Krishi Star" as a General Manager, Marketing.

Sathe has built farm-to-market supply chains both Nationally and Internationally focusing on indigenous cereals and grains, indigenous variety of livestock benefiting more than 30,000 small & marginal farmers across four states in India. Her company incentivised farmers for producing high quality, indigenous grains by paying them 50% more than usual market price and creating healthy, nutritious snack food from these grains which would appeal to urban customers. In the case of women farmers in Ahmednagar their income has tripled as they grew buckwheat for Sathe's business. Her product range includes crackers and cookies made from wheat, buckwheat, Amarnath seeds, Flax seed and barley.

Sathe gave a TEDx talk at "Serene Meadows" in July 2020 on the power of small changes.

Awards
Sathe was awarded "Business Today"’s "Most Powerful Women" Award in 2017.

Digital Women Awards, powered by SheThePeople, Facebook, Google, 2017

Sathe was invited to the Presidential Palace (Rashtrapati Bhavan) in New Delhi on International Women’s Day in 2017 to be awarded the 2016 Nari Shakti Puraskar. She was one of 27 women who were recognised and five organisations were also honoured.

References 

20th-century births
Living people
Nari Shakti Puraskar winners
Indian businesspeople
Year of birth missing (living people)